Paul DePodesta (born December 16, 1972) is an American football executive and former baseball executive who is the chief strategy officer of the Cleveland Browns of the National Football League (NFL). He previously served as a front-office assistant for the Cleveland Indians, Oakland Athletics, and New York Mets. DePodesta was also general manager of the Los Angeles Dodgers. He is also known for his appearance in the book and movie Moneyball about his early career as an assistant with the Oakland Athletics.

Early life 
DePodesta is a native of Alexandria, Virginia, where he grew up with Thad Levine. He attended Episcopal High School ('91) and then Harvard University, where he played baseball and football and graduated in 1995 with a degree in economics. He has worked for the Baltimore Stallions of the Canadian Football League and the Baltimore Bandits of the American Hockey League.

Career

Major League Baseball

Early career
In 1996, DePodesta got his first baseball job with the Cleveland Indians, where he spent three seasons. He served as an advance scout for two years and in his final month with the club was appointed special assistant to general manager John Hart.

In 1999, he joined the Oakland Athletics organization as an assistant to general manager Billy Beane. DePodesta was a key figure in Michael Lewis's book Moneyball. The book thrust the analytical principles of sabermetrics into the mainstream.

Los Angeles Dodgers
At the age of 31, DePodesta was named general manager of the Los Angeles Dodgers on February 16, 2004, making him the fifth-youngest general manager in baseball history.

DePodesta's reliance on sabermetric principles has been somewhat controversial. He is often considered part of a new breed of front-office executives whose personnel decisions depend heavily on analysis of performance data, often at the perceived expense of more traditional methods of scouting and observation.

One of DePodesta's most notable moves was made at the 2004 trading deadline. He traded catcher Paul Lo Duca, relief pitcher Guillermo Mota and outfielder Juan Encarnación to the Florida Marlins in exchange for pitcher Brad Penny, first baseman Hee Seop Choi and pitcher Bill Murphy, in what was reportedly an attempt to pick up pieces to acquire pitcher Randy Johnson from the Arizona Diamondbacks. DePodesta was heavily criticized in the local and national baseball media for this trade, because Lo Duca was thought to be the "heart and soul" of the team. The Dodgers made the playoffs anyway, with Penny developing into one of the better pitchers in the National League during his stint with the Dodgers, which lasted until the end of the 2008 season. Choi, however, was a disappointment, batting just .161 in 2004 and .253 in 2005, and striking out 80 times in 320 at bats. Bill Murphy was traded that year to acquire Steve Finley, who hit 13 homers in 58 games, including a memorable grand slam that clinched the division title. Lo Duca played through 2005 with the Marlins and then went to the New York Mets, the Washington Nationals and back to the Marlins, making his final Major League appearance in September 2008.

During the 2004 off-season, Adrián Beltré, who had hit 48 home runs in 2004, signed with Seattle as a free agent, spurning DePodesta's offer of 3 years for $30 million for Seattle's offer of 5 years for $64 million. DePodesta signed J. D. Drew, Jeff Kent, and Derek Lowe. Drew enjoyed two productive seasons as a Dodger and then used an opt-out clause in his contract to sign a new 5-year deal with the Boston Red Sox. Both Kent and Lowe put in four productive seasons for the Dodgers and cut ties with the franchise at the end of the 2008 season with Kent retiring and Lowe signing a contract with the Atlanta Braves.

Coming off the successes of 2004, the 2005 season saw the Dodgers lose a number of players to significant stints on the disabled list. Many of the players lost to injury were expected to produce heavily for the team, including J. D. Drew, Milton Bradley, Éric Gagné, Jayson Werth, César Izturis and Odalis Pérez. The 2005 season resulted in the team's worst record since 1992 and second worst since moving to Los Angeles in 1958. On October 29, 2005, Dodgers owner Frank McCourt fired DePodesta, citing his desire to see the club win and that DePodesta had not met those expectations. Reports surfaced that the real reason McCourt had fired DePodesta was his inability to find satisfactory managerial candidates to replace Jim Tracy. He was later replaced by Ned Colletti, who hired Grady Little as manager. Some have speculated that McCourt fired DePodesta in response to media criticism from Los Angeles Times sports columnists T.J. Simers and Bill Plaschke, who were vehemently "anti-Moneyball" and referred to DePodesta pejoratively as "Google Boy."

San Diego Padres and New York Mets

On June 30, 2006, DePodesta was hired as the Special Assistant for Baseball Operations for the San Diego Padres and was promoted to Executive Vice President on November 10, 2008.

On November 8, 2010, DePodesta was hired as the vice president of player development and scouting for the New York Mets by general manager Sandy Alderson, with whom DePodesta worked when Alderson was CEO of the Padres.

National Football League

Cleveland Browns
On January 5, 2016, DePodesta was hired by the Cleveland Browns of the National Football League (NFL) as their chief strategy officer.

On July 31, 2021, it was reported that the Browns and DePodesta had agreed to a 5-year contract extension.

On March 18, 2022, DePodesta helped to facilitate a controversial trade for Deshaun Watson.  Watson and the Texans' 2024 sixth-round draft pick were traded to the Cleveland Browns in exchange for the Browns' first-round draft picks in 2022, 2023, and 2024, as well as the Browns' third-round pick in 2023 and fourth-round picks in 2022 and 2024. As part of the trade, Watson signed a new, fully guaranteed, five-year, $230 million deal with the Browns, making it the largest contract and most guaranteed money in NFL history.

Other ventures
On December 13, 2012, DePodesta was elected to the Board of Directors of Sears Holdings Corporation. He has also served as a keynote speaker at numerous business conventions and been recognized by several publications, including Baseball Prospectus and Fortune Magazine, which named him one of the Top 10 innovators under the age of 40.

Personal life 
DePodesta is married to artist and philanthropist Karen Deicas and has three sons and a daughter. In 2016, Deicas launched the Sports Mind Institute, which seeks to connect lessons learned from figures in professional sports, athletes, team executives, and coaches, to help others apply them to life and the business sector. The family resides in the La Jolla neighborhood of San Diego, California.

Moneyball
In 2003, author Michael Lewis was interested in how Oakland Athletics general manager (GM) Billy Beane tried to find quality players to improve the team while struggling with one of the smallest payrolls in Major League Baseball. He first wanted to write an article on the subject, but the idea eventually blossomed into a book named Moneyball: The Art of Winning an Unfair Game. Lewis's interests included how Beane hired DePodesta as his assistant to incorporate sabermetrics, an approach that consists of more sophisticated analyses of baseball statistics, which is at least partially credited for their 2002 20-game winning streak which set an American League record.

Lewis's book examines the lives and careers of various baseball personalities and explains the art of sabermetrics. Bill James, who coined the term sabermetrics for the Society for American Baseball Research (SABR), is also a major focus. James published The Bill James Baseball Abstract from 1977 to 1988 and wrote several sabermetrics books. Beane and DePodesta had studied James's work and were inspired by his knowledge of baseball analysis.

DePodesta did not feel comfortable in the spotlight after the book's release, nor did he care for the secrets revealed about his scouting methods. The book earned DePodesta a reputation as a cold calculator, choosing players based only on their numbers. In addition, he was thought of as a guy who knew nothing of "real baseball."

In reality, DePodesta played football in college and wanted to be a football coach, seen in a photo wearing number 17. After graduating from Harvard with a degree in economics, he became an intern for the Canadian Football League's Baltimore Stallions in 1995. In early 1996, he got his first baseball job with the Cleveland Indians, where he worked as a scout. In October 1996, at age 24, he was promoted to the position of advance scout. In October 1998, he became assistant to the General Manager for the team. Those experiences led to him being hired by Beane as his assistant with the Oakland A's in November 1998.

When the movie Moneyball was adapted from the book, DePodesta did not approve of the way his character was portrayed. "There were a handful of things. Some were factual, others were more ephemeral." He had no objection to Jonah Hill's performance. "Jonah was awesome. He was so respectful of me and my time. It would have been flattering to be portrayed by someone of his expertise. It had nothing to do with the casting," DePodesta said in 2010. "I just could never get comfortable with the idea of somebody else portraying me to the rest of the world. Like any movie, to make it interesting, there has to be some conflict there. In some respects, a lot of the conflict is going to revolve around my character, and that was never really the case in reality," he said in 2011. He also talked about the focus that was brought on him, first in 2003 and again in 2011. "The other problem was I wasn't all that interested in the attention. It had already happened from the book. And I didn't necessarily need to relive it."

The role was originally going to be given DePodesta's name and portrayed by Demetri Martin, but DePodesta did not want his name or likeness to be used in the movie, so the character was named Peter Brand. Brand is a composite of Beane's assistants in Oakland, not an accurate representation of any specific person. But Moneyballs director, Bennett Miller, has credited DePodesta for being generous and helpful in the making of the film. Hill was nominated for an Academy Award for Best Supporting Actor for his performance.

References

External links 

Official Padres biography
The Genesis, Implementation, and Management of New Systems

1972 births
Living people
American football wide receivers
Baltimore Bandits
Cleveland Browns executives
Episcopal High School (Alexandria, Virginia) alumni
Harvard College alumni
Harvard Crimson football players
Los Angeles Dodgers executives
Major League Baseball executives
Major League Baseball general managers
New York Mets executives
Oakland Athletics executives
San Diego Padres executives